The Saco River is a river in the state of Pará, Brazil. It is a left tributary of the Paracauari River.

Location

The Saco river is on Marajó island in Pará state, and is contained within the Marajó Archipelago Environmental Protection Area.
It is a left tributary of the Paracauari River, which enters the Atlantic at Soure, Pará.
The mangroves of the left (east) bank of the Saco are protected by the Soure Marine Extractive Reserve.
The climate is equatorial Amazon.

See also
List of rivers of Pará

References

Sources

Rivers of Pará